The Illinois state government has numerous departments, but the so-called code departments provide most of the state's services.

Code departments
 Department on Aging
 Department of Agriculture
 Department of Central Management Services
 Department of Children and Family Services
 Department of Commerce and Economic Opportunity
 Department of Corrections
 Department of Employment Security
 Emergency Management Agency
 Department of Financial and Professional Regulation
 Department of Healthcare and Family Services
 Department of Human Rights
 Department of Human Services
 Department of Innovation and Technology
 Department of Insurance
 Department of Juvenile Justice
 Department of Labor
 Department of the Lottery
 Department of Military Affairs
 Department of Natural Resources
 Department of Public Health
 Department of Revenue
 Department of State Police
 Department of Transportation
 Department of Veterans' Affairs

Boards, commissions and offices
There are also many boards, commissions and offices, including:

Abraham Lincoln Presidential Library and Museum
Attorney Registration & Disciplinary Commission of the Supreme Court of Illinois
Illinois Arts Council
Illinois State Board of Elections
Illinois Board of Higher Education
Illinois Budgeting for Results Commission
Illinois Bureau of Criminal Investigations
Capital Development Board
Illinois Civil Service Commission
Illinois Commerce Commission
Illinois Commission on Government Forecasting and Accountability
Illinois Commission on Volunteerism and Community Service
Illinois Community and Residential Services Authority
Illinois Community College Board
Illinois Comprehensive Health Insurance Plan
Illinois Council on Developmental Disabilities
Illinois Criminal Justice Information Authority
Illinois Deaf and Hard of Hearing Commission
Illinois Educational Labor Relations Board
Illinois Environmental Protection Agency
Illinois Executive Ethics Commission
Illinois Export Advisory Council
Illinois Finance Authority
Illinois Gaming Board
Illinois General Assembly
Illinois Guardianship and Advocacy Commission
Illinois Health Information Exchange Authority
Illinois Historic Preservation Agency
Illinois House Democrats
Illinois House Republicans
Illinois Housing Development Authority
Illinois Human Rights Commission
Illinois Independent Tax Tribunal
Illinois Judicial Inquiry Board
Illinois Labor Relations Board
Illinois Law Enforcement Training and Standards Board
Illinois Liquor Control Commission
Illinois Medical District Commission
Illinois National Guard
Illinois Office of Management and Budget
Illinois Pollution Control Board
Illinois Power Agency
Illinois Prisoner Review Board
Illinois Procurement Policy Board
Illinois Property Tax Appeal Board
Illinois Racing Board
Illinois Senate Democrats
Illinois Senate Republicans
Illinois State Board of Education
Illinois State Board of Investment
Illinois State Fair
Illinois State Police
Illinois State Police Merit Board
Illinois State Toll Highway Authority
Illinois State Universities Civil Service System
Illinois State Universities Retirement System
Illinois Student Assistance Commission
Illinois Workers' Compensation Commission
Office of the Illinois Attorney General
Office of the Illinois Auditor General
Office of the Illinois Comptroller
Office of the Illinois Governor
Office of the Illinois Lieutenant Governor
Office of the Illinois Secretary of State
Office of the Illinois State Appellate Defender
Office of the Illinois State Fire Marshal
Office of the Illinois State Treasurer
Office of the Illinois State's Attorneys Appellate Prosecutor
State Retirement Systems of Illinois
Teachers' Retirement System of the State of Illinois

References

External links
 State Agencies of Illinois

Agencies
Illinois